Celtis bungeana, commonly known as  Bunge's hackberry is a deciduous tree in the genus Celtis that can grow 15 meters in height.

Range
The species is native to the temperate zone of Asia in China and Korea.

Flowers and fruit
The tree flowers from April to May, and the fruit ripens from October to November.

References

 The Plant List

External links

bungeana
Flora of China